Dasht-e Rais (also Romanized as Dasht-e Ra’īs; also known as Hāshem Khān, Qal‘eh Hāshim Khān, and Qal‘eh-ye Hāshem Khān) is a village in Sarchehan Rural District, Sarchehan District, Bavanat County, Fars Province, Iran. At the 2006 census, its population was 158, in 47 families.

References 

Populated places in Sarchehan County